Caroline Fox (24 May 1819 – 12 January 1871) was an English diarist and correspondent from Cornwall. Her diary records memories of major writers, who include John Stuart Mill and Thomas Carlyle.

Biography
Caroline Fox was born on 24 May 1819 at Penjerrick, near Falmouth, to Robert Were Fox, an inventor, and Maria Barclay. Both were Quakers. She was the younger sister of Barclay Fox, also a diarist, and of Anna Maria Fox.

Caroline's diaries record memories of people such as John Stuart Mill, John Sterling and Thomas Carlyle. Selections from her diary and letters (1835–1871) appeared as Memories of Old Friends: Caroline Fox of Penjerrick, Cornwall. A selection from the Victorian edition appeared in 1972.

With two of her siblings, Fox helped found the Falmouth Polytechnic, later the Royal Cornwall Polytechnic Society.

Caroline Fox died on 12 January 1871 at Penjerrick and was buried at a Quaker cemetery in Budock.

Notes and references

Further reading

1819 births
1871 deaths
19th-century British women writers
19th-century British writers
19th-century diarists
English diarists
Caroline
Women diarists